is a Taishō-era stone bridge over the Yamakuni River in Yabakei, Nakatsu, Ōita Prefecture, Japan. Construction work on the eight-arched bridge, built as part of a tourist road for the viewing of the nearby Aonodōmon, began in 1920 and was completed in 1923; repair and restoration work took place in 1999. At  in length, it is the longest stone bridge in the country, and has been designated an Important Cultural Property.

References

See also

 List of Places of Scenic Beauty of Japan (Ōita)

Bridges in Japan
Nakatsu, Ōita
Buildings and structures in Ōita Prefecture
Important Cultural Properties of Japan
Bridges completed in 1923